John Wesley Jarvis (1780 or 1781 – January 14, 1839) was an American painter.

Biography
John Wesley Jarvis (great, great nephew of Methodist leader John Wesley), was born at South Shields, England. His father was an English mariner, who moved his family to the United States in the mid-1780s.  The Jarvis family settled in Philadelphia; there he spent his childhood and began his artistic training. He is known to have frequented the studio of the aging colonial-era portrait painter Matthew Pratt and he knew the Danish painter Christian Gullager. His formal instruction began around 1796, when he became apprenticed to Edward Savage. He also spent times with David Edwin, an English engraver also employed by Savage.

Jarvis moved to New York in 1801 with Edward Savage.  Within a year he was working on his own as an engraver. In 1803 he entered into a partnership with Joseph Wood.  His partnership with Wood lasted seven years. Together they executed engravings, miniatures, and larger portraits. Jarvis had learned the technique of miniature painting from Edward Malbone; and by the time of the Jarvis/Wood partnership, he was also producing his first oil paintings. In addition, he operated a drawing school and executed inexpensive silhouette portraits.  In New York City he enjoyed great popularity, though his conviviality and eccentric mode of life affected his work. He visited Baltimore, Charleston, and New Orleans, entertaining much and painting portraits of prominent people, particularly in New Orleans, where General Andrew Jackson was one of his sitters. Isaac Collins, the New York City printer, became a favorite subject for Jarvis to sketch a portrait of in 1806. He had for assistants at different times both Thomas Sully and Henry Inman. He affected singularity in dress and manners, and his mots were the talk of the day.

In 1809, Jarvis married Betsy Burtis (who died four years later in 1813, leaving him with two children). He parted with his family in order to seek portrait commissions in Baltimore. Although he made occasional trips back to New York, he remained in Baltimore for several years. While New York always remained his home base, he continued his habit of extended residences in other cities for most of the rest of his life. During the 1820s and 30s, for example, he sought work in South Carolina, Kentucky, Louisiana, Massachusetts, Washington, Virginia, Ohio, and Georgia. His apprentice, Henry Inman, probably accompanied him on these trips until his term of service ended in 1822.

Jarvis rose to the top of his profession by 1814, when he took over an unprecedented commission for six full-length portraits of the naval heroes of the War of 1812 for the City of New York. (Gilbert Stuart had given up the important project after a dispute with the patrons). For over a decade, he remained the premier portrait painter in New York, with important ties to the political, mercantile, and cultural elite. Jarvis was also something of a social outsider, known for his ostentatious dress, flippant manner, and propensity to consume alcohol. He was celebrated as a hilarious storyteller, and his ties to the theater world were many.

As early as the 1820s, however, he received some personal setbacks. In 1823 he was sued successfully by his apprentice John Quidor for breach of contract, and the following year he lost custody of his children in a court battle with his estranged second wife. A decade later, in 1834, he suffered a debilitating stroke while in New Orleans. Partially paralyzed and mentally incapacitated, he spent the rest of his life in New York City, cared for by his sister. He died there in 1839, in poverty.

Examples of his painting are in the collections of the New York Historical Society, and the Metropolitan Museum of Art.

Gallery

References

Attribution

External links

Biography at Maryland ArtSource
Art and the empire city: New York, 1825-1861, an exhibition catalog from The Metropolitan Museum of Art (fully available online as PDF), which contains material on Jarvis (see index)
 Metropolitan Museum of Art  Works by John Wesley Jarvis included in their Permanent Collection

1780 births
1839 deaths
19th-century American painters
19th-century American male artists
American male painters
American portrait painters
English portrait painters